{{DISPLAYTITLE:15-hydroxyprostaglandin-I dehydrogenase (NADP+)}}

In enzymology, a 15-hydroxyprostaglandin-I dehydrogenase (NADP+) is an enzyme that catalyzes the chemical reaction

(5Z,13E)-(15S)-6,9alpha-epoxy-11alpha,15-dihydroxyprosta-5,13- dienoate + NADP+  (5Z,13E)-6,9alpha-epoxy-11alpha-hydroxy-15-oxoprosta-5,13-dienoate + NADPH + H+

The 3 substrates of this enzyme are (5Z,13E)-(15S)-6,9alpha-epoxy-11alpha,15-dihydroxyprosta-5,13-, dienoate, and NADP+, whereas its 3 products are (5Z,13E)-6,9alpha-epoxy-11alpha-hydroxy-15-oxoprosta-5,13-dienoate, NADPH, and H+.

This enzyme belongs to the family of oxidoreductases, specifically those acting on the CH-OH group of donor with NAD+ or NADP+ as acceptor. The systematic name of this enzyme class is (5Z,13E)-(15S)-6,9alpha-epoxy-11alpha,15-dihydroxyprosta-5,13-dienoa te:NADP+ 15-oxidoreductase. Other names in common use include prostacyclin dehydrogenase, PG I2 dehydrogenase, prostacyclin dehydrogenase, NADP+-linked 15-hydroxyprostaglandin (prostacyclin) dehydrogenase, NADP+-dependent PGI2-specific 15-hydroxyprostaglandin dehydrogenase, and 15-hydroxyprostaglandin-I dehydrogenase (NADP+).

References

 

EC 1.1.1
NADPH-dependent enzymes
Enzymes of unknown structure